Accra kassaicola is a species of moth of the family Tortricidae. It is found in the Democratic Republic of Congo.

The wingspan is 11.5–12 mm. The ground colour of the forewings is bluish grey with an indistinct greenish admixture. The costa and termen are finely edged with yellow and dotted blackish. There are four red oblique fasciae. The hindwings are brown.

References

Moths described in 2005
Tortricini
Moths of Africa